The eighth season of JAG premiered on CBS on September 24, 2002, and concluded on May 20, 2003. The season, starring David James Elliott and Catherine Bell, was produced by Belisarius Productions in association with Paramount Television.

The two episodes, "Ice Queen" and "Meltdown" also introduced the team who later appeared in the spin-off series NCIS which became a franchise in its own right.

Plot 
Tenacious lawyer Lieutenant Colonel Sarah "Mac" MacKenzie (Catherine Bell), a by-the-book Marine, is tasked with prosecuting, defending, and enforcing the laws of the sea as a member of the Navy's elite Judge Advocate General Corps. Along with her partner Commander Harmon "Harm" Rabb, Jr. (David James Elliott) - a former Tomcat pilot - Mac investigates a plethora of cases including desertion ("The Promised Land"), oxygen deprivation ("In Thin Air"), sexual harassment ("Offensive Action"), a mishap aboard the USS Seahawk ("When the Bough Breaks"), and a death during surgery ("Complications"). Also this season, Bud Roberts (Patrick Labyorteaux) is injured in Afghanistan ("Critical Condition"), Petty Officer Jennifer Coates (Zoe McLellan) joins JAG ("All Ye Faithful"), Commander Theodore Lindsey (W.K. Stratton) returns ("Fortunate Son"), Clayton Webb (Steven Culp) goes missing in Paraguay ("A Tangled Webb"), and Rear Admiral A.J. Chegwidden (John M. Jackson) accidentally ejects from an F-14 Tomcat ("Heart and Soul"). Meanwhile, Lieutenant Loren Singer (Nanci Chambers) is murdered ("Ice Queen"), placing Leroy Jethro Gibbs (Mark Harmon) and his NCIS team directly in Harm's way ("Meltdown").

Production 
In January 2003, CBS president Leslie Moonves announced that JAG executive producer and showrunner Donald P. Bellisario was developing a JAG spin-off, based on the work of the Naval Criminal Investigative Service. Tentatively titled Navy CIS, the series premiered during the JAG episodes "Ice Queen" and "Meltdown". Also this season, Dean Stockwell joins the cast as his First Monday character Senator Edward Sheffield.

Cast and characters

Main

Also starring

Recurring

Guest appearances

Episodes

See also
 2002–2003 United States network television schedule

Notes

References 

08
2002 American television seasons
2003 American television seasons